Dell is an unincorporated community in Emerald Township, Faribault County, Minnesota, United States.

Notes

Unincorporated communities in Faribault County, Minnesota
Unincorporated communities in Minnesota